Afrocyclops pauliani is an extinct species of copepod in the family Cyclopidae. A single specimen was discovered in 1951 in a small freshwater pool near Antananarivo, Madagascar, but the species has not been seen in collections since.

References

Cyclopidae
Freshwater crustaceans of Africa
Extinct animals of Africa
Extinct invertebrates since 1500
Crustaceans described in 1951
Extinct crustaceans
Taxonomy articles created by Polbot